The Return of Dr. Fu Manchu is a 1930 American pre-Code film directed by Rowland V. Lee. It is the second of three films starring Warner Oland as the fiendish Fu Manchu, who returns from apparent death in the previous film, The Mysterious Dr. Fu Manchu (1929), to seek revenge on those he holds responsible for the death of his wife and child.

Cast
 Warner Oland as Fu Manchu
 O. P. Heggie as Inspector Nayland Smith
 Jean Arthur as Lia Eltham
 Neil Hamilton as Dr. Jack Petrie
 Evelyn Hall as Lady Agatha Bartley
 William Austin as Sylvester Wadsworth
 Margaret Fealy as Lady Helen Bartley
 Shayle Gardner as Detective Harding
 Evelyn Selbie as Fai Lu
 Olaf Hytten as Deacon at Wedding (uncredited)

Production

Writing
It was loosely adapted from the 1916 novel of the same name by Sax Rohmer.

Critical reception
The New York Times critic wrote, "melodramatic as the film is, it is not quite as exciting as its predecessor, The Mysterious Dr. Fu, in which Warner Oland did better work. O.P. Heggie as the inspector, Neil Hamilton as Petrie and Jean Arthur in the rôle of Lia are acceptable".

References

External links

 
 
 

1930 films
1930 crime films
1930 mystery films
American black-and-white films
American mystery films
Films based on British novels
Films directed by Rowland V. Lee
American detective films
Paramount Pictures films
American crime films
Films with screenplays by Florence Ryerson
Fu Manchu films
1930s American films